Venusia maniata is a moth in the family Geometridae first described by Dayong Xue in 1999. It is found in China.

References

Moths described in 1999
Venusia (moth)